Wilson Tumwine is a Ugandan Politician and businessman. He is the former Mbarara City Mayor, and the owner of Pelikan Hotel. He was among the list of politicians who had allegedly grabbed government land.

References 

Living people
Ugandan politicians
Year of birth missing (living people)